Niger competed at the 2014 Summer Youth Olympics, in Nanjing, China from 16 August to 28 August 2014.

Athletics

Niger qualified one athlete.

Qualification Legend: Q=Final A (medal); qB=Final B (non-medal); qC=Final C (non-medal); qD=Final D (non-medal); qE=Final E (non-medal)

Girls
Track & road events

Fencing

Niger was given a quota to compete by the tripartite committee.

Boys

Judo

Niger was given a quota to compete by the tripartite committee.

Individual

Team

Taekwondo

Niger was given a wild card to compete.

Boys

References

2014 in Nigerien sport
Nations at the 2014 Summer Youth Olympics
Niger at the Youth Olympics